The following is a list of ecoregions in Kazakhstan as identified by the World Wide Fund for Nature (WWF).

Terrestrial

Temperate coniferous forests
 Altai montane forest and forest steppe (China, Kazakhstan, Mongolia, Russia)
 Tian Shan montane conifer forests (Kyrgyzstan, Kazakhstan, Russia)

Temperate grasslands, savannas and shrublands
 Alai-Western Tian Shan steppe (Kazakhstan, Uzbekistan, Turkmenistan)
 Altai steppe and semi-desert (Kazakhstan, China)
 Emin Valley steppe (Kazakhstan, China)
 Gissaro-Alai open woodlands (Afghanistan, Kazakhstan, Kyrgyzstan, Tajikistan, Uzbekistan)
 Kazakh forest steppe (Kazakhstan, Russia)
 Kazakh steppe (Kazakhstan, Russia)
 Kazakh upland (Kazakhstan)
 Pontic steppe (Moldova, Romania, Russia, Ukraine, Kazakhstan)
 Tian Shan foothill arid steppe (Kazakhstan, Kyrgyzstan, China)

Montane grasslands and shrublands
 Altai alpine meadow and tundra (China, Kazakhstan, Mongolia, Russia)
 Tian Shan montane steppe and meadows (China, Kazakhstan, Kyrgyzstan, Tajikistan)

Deserts and xeric shrublands
 Caspian lowland desert (Iran, Kazakhstan, Russia, Turkmenistan)
 Central Asian northern desert (Kazakhstan, Uzbekistan)
 Central Asian riparian woodlands (Kazakhstan, Uzbekistan, Turkmenistan)
 Central Asian southern desert (Kazakhstan, Uzbekistan, Turkmenistan)
 Junggar Basin semi-desert (Kazakhstan, China, Mongolia)
 Kazakh semi-desert (Kazakhstan)

 
Kazakhstan
ecoregions